NEON TV or NEON Televizija is a Bosnian local commercial Cable television channel based in Kalesija, Bosnia and Herzegovina. The program is mainly produced in Bosnian language and it is available in Tuzla Canton in HD resolution.

References

External links 
 www.ntv.ba (Official website)

Television stations in Bosnia and Herzegovina